Japan is an archipelagic country in East Asia, located in the Northwestern Pacific Ocean.
Japan may also refer to:

Places
 Empire of Japan, former political government of Japan (1868–1947)
 Japan, Montenegro
 Japan, Missouri, an unincorporated community in the United States

Lacquerware
 Japanese lacquerware or japan, a broad category of fine and decorative arts
 Japan black or japan, a lacquer or varnish used on iron and steel
 Japanning, European imitation of Asian lacquerwork
 Pontypool japan, the process of japanning with the use of an oil varnish and heat

Plants
 Japan (fig), a common fig cultivar

Animals
 Japan (horse) (born 2016), Thoroughbred racehorse

Literature
 Japan (1992 manga), a 1992 manga with art by Kentarou Miura
 Japan (1994 manga), a 1994 manga by Eiji Ōtsuka

Film
 Japan (film), a 2008 independent film starring Shane Brolly and Peter Fonda
 Japan (1960 film), a short film; see List of Disney live-action shorts
 Japan (2023 film), upcoming film written and directed by Raju Murugan
 Japón (film), a 2002 film by Mexican director Carlos Reygadas

Music
 Japan (band), a British art rock band

Albums
 Japan (Japan album)
 JPN (album), a 2011 album by girl group Perfume
 Japan (Tsuyoshi Nagabuchi album), a 1991 album, see Tsuyoshi Nagabuchi discography

Songs
 "Japan", a song by Be-Bop Deluxe, 1977
 "Japan", a song by Abwärts, 1979
 "Japan", a song by Landscape, 1979
 "Japan", a song by Amanda Lear, 1980
 "Japan", a song by Kenny G, 1985
 "Japan", a song by Scarlett and Black, 1987
 "Japan", a song by The Lonely Island, 2011
 "Japan", a song by Tired Lion from Dumb Days, 2017
 "Japan" (Famous Dex song), 2018

See also
 Japanese (disambiguation)
 Nippon (disambiguation)